William Miles Malleson (25 May 1888 – 15 March 1969) was an English actor and dramatist, particularly remembered for his appearances in British comedy films of the 1930s to 1960s. Towards the end of his career he also appeared in cameo roles in several Hammer horror films, with a fairly large role in The Brides of Dracula as the hypochondriac and fee-hungry local doctor. Malleson was also a writer on many films, including some of those in which he had small parts, such as Nell Gwyn (1934) and The Thief of Bagdad (1940). He also translated and adapted several of Molière's plays (The Misanthrope, which he titled The Slave of Truth,  Tartuffe and The Imaginary Invalid).

Biography
Malleson was born in Avondale Road, South Croydon, Surrey, England, the son of Edmund Taylor Malleson (1859-1909), a manufacturing chemist, and Myrrha Bithynia Frances Borrell (1863-1931), a descendant of the numismatist Henry Perigal Borrell and the inventor Francis Maceroni. (Miles' cousin and contemporary, Lucy Malleson, had a long career as a mystery novelist, mostly under the pen name "Anthony Gilbert".)

He was educated at Brighton College and Emmanuel College, Cambridge. At Cambridge, he created a sensation when it was discovered that he had successfully posed as a politician and given a speech instead of the visitor who had failed to attend a debating society dinner.

As an undergraduate, Malleson made his first stage appearance in November 1909, playing the slave Sosias in the biennial Cambridge Greek Play production of Aristophanes' 'The Wasps' presented at the New Theatre, Cambridge.

He turned professional in November 1911. He studied acting at Herbert Beerbohm Tree's Academy of Dramatic Art, which later was renamed the  Royal Academy of Dramatic Art (RADA). Here he met his first wife in 1913.

In September 1914, he enlisted in the Army, and was sent to Malta, but was invalided home and discharged in January 1915. In late 1915, Malleson met Clifford Allen, who converted Malleson to pacifism and socialism. Malleson subsequently became a member of the peace organisation, the No-Conscription Fellowship. By June 1916 he was writing in support of conscientious objectors. Malleson wrote two anti-war plays, "D" Company and Black 'Ell. When the plays were published in book form in 1916, copies were seized from the printers by the police, who described them as "a deliberate calumny on the British soldier". Malleson was a supporter of the Bolshevik revolution and a founder member of the socialist 1917 Club in Soho. Another play of Malleson's, Paddly Pools, (a children's play with a socialist message) was frequently performed by British amateur dramatic groups in the period after World War I.

In the 1920s, Malleson became director of the Arts Guild of the Independent Labour Party. In this capacity Malleson helped establish amateur dramatics companies across Britain. The Arts Guild also helped stage plays by George Bernard Shaw, John Galsworthy and Laurence Housman, as well as Malleson's own work. His 1934 play Six Men of Dorset (written with Harvey Brooks), about the Tolpuddle Martyrs, was later performed by local theatre groups under the guidance of the Left Book Club Theatre Guild.

Malleson married three times and had many relationships. In 1915, he married writer and aspiring actress Lady Constance Malleson, who was also interested in social reform.  Theirs was an open marriage and they divorced amicably in 1923 so that he could marry Joan Billson; they divorced in 1940. His third wife was Tatiana Lieven, whom he married in 1946 and from whom he had been separated for several years at the time of his death.

Malleson had a receding chin and a sharp nose that produced the effect of a double chin.  His manner was gentle and absent-minded; his voice, soft and high. He is best remembered for his roles as the Sultan in The Thief of Bagdad (1940), the poetically-inclined hangman in Kind Hearts and Coronets (1949), and as Dr. Chasuble in The Importance of Being Earnest (1952). He was capable of excellent classical performances. For example, Sir John Gielgud noted that Malleson was 'splendid' as Polonius in Hamlet.

Failing eyesight led to his being unable to work in his last years. He died in March 1969, following surgery to remove cataracts and was cremated in a private ceremony. A memorial service was held at St Martin-in-the-Fields during which Sybil Thorndike and Laurence Olivier gave readings.

Partial filmography

As actor

The Headmaster (1921) .... Palliser Grantley
The W Plan (1930) .... Minor Role (British Version) (uncredited)
The Yellow Mask (1930) .... Minor Role (uncredited)
Night Birds (1930) .... Minor Role (uncredited)
Children of Chance (1930) .... Minor Role (uncredited)
City of Song (1931) .... Theatre Watchman
The Woman Between (1931) .... Minor Role (uncredited)
Sally in Our Alley (1931) .... Minor Role (uncredited)
Night in Montmartre (1931) .... Minor Role (uncredited)
The Blue Danube (1932) .... Minor Role (uncredited)
Frail Women (1932) .... The Registrar
The Water Gipsies (1932) .... Minor Role (uncredited)
The Sign of Four (1932) .... Thaddeus Sholto
The Mayor's Nest (1932) .... Clerk
Love on Wheels (1932) .... Academy of Music Porter
Thark (1932)
The Love Contract (1932) .... Peters
Money Means Nothing (1932) .... Doorman
Strange Evidence (1933) .... (uncredited)
Perfect Understanding (1933) .... Announcer
Bitter Sweet (1933) .... The Butler
Summer Lightning (1933) .... Beach
The Queen's Affair (1934) .... The Chancellor
Evergreen (1934) .... Minor Role (uncredited)
Nell Gwynn (1934) .... Chiffinch
Falling in Love (1934) .... Minor Role (uncredited)
Brewster's Millions (1935) .... Hamilton Higginbottom Button (uncredited)
Lazybones (1935) .... Pessimist
The 39 Steps (1935) .... Palladium Manager (uncredited)
Vintage Wine (1935) .... Henri Popinot
Peg of Old Drury (1935) .... Minor Role (uncredited)
Rhodes of Africa (1936) .... Minor Role (uncredited)
Tudor Rose (1936) .... Jane's Father
Knight Without Armour (1937) .... Drunken Red Commissar
Victoria the Great (1937) .... Sir James the Physician
The Rat (1937) .... Minor Role (uncredited)
Action for Slander (1938) .... Minor Role (uncredited)
A Royal Divorce (1938) .... Minor Role (uncredited)
Sixty Glorious Years (1938) .... Wounded Soldier (uncredited)
Q Planes (1939) .... Minor Role (uncredited)
The Lion Has Wings (1939) .... Minor Role (uncredited)
For Freedom (1940) .... Minor Role
The Thief of Bagdad (1940) .... Sultan
Major Barbara (1941) .... Morrison
This Was Paris (1942) .... Watson, Newspaper Librarian
They Flew Alone (1942) .... Vacuum Salesman
Unpublished Story (1942) .... Farmfield
The First of the Few (1942) .... Vickers Representative (uncredited)
Thunder Rock (1942) .... Chairman of Directors
The Gentle Sex (1943) .... Guard
The Demi-Paradise (1943) .... Theatre Cashier
Dead of Night (1945) .... Hearse Driver/Bus Conductor
Journey Together (1945) .... (uncredited)
While the Sun Shines (1947) .... Horton
The Mark of Cain (1947) .... Mr. Burden (uncredited)
One Night with You (1948) .... Jailer
The Idol of Paris (1948) .... Offenbach
Bond Street (1948) .... Minor Role (uncredited)
Saraband for Dead Lovers (1948) .... Lord of Misrule
Woman Hater (1948) .... Vicar
The History of Mr. Polly (1949) .... Old gentleman on punt
Cardboard Cavalier (1949) .... Judge Gorebucket
The Queen of Spades (1949) .... Tchybukin
The Perfect Woman (1949) .... Prof. Ernest Belman
Kind Hearts and Coronets (1949) .... The Hangman
Adam and Evelyne (1949) .... Undetermined Supporting Role (uncredited)
Train of Events (1949) .... Johnson, the timekeeper (segment "The Engine Driver")
Golden Salamander (1950) .... Douvet
Stage Fright (1950) .... Mr. Fortesque
The Man in the White Suit (1951) .... The Tailor
Scrooge (1951) .... Old Joe
The Magic Box (1951) .... Orchestra Conductor
The Woman's Angle (1952) .... A. Secrett
The Happy Family (1952) .... Mr. Thwaites
Treasure Hunt (1952) .... Mr. Walsh
The Importance of Being Earnest (1952) .... Canon Chasuble
Venetian Bird (1952) .... Grespi
Trent's Last Case (1952) .... Burton Cupples
Folly to Be Wise (1953) .... Dr. Hector McAdam
The Captain's Paradise (1953) .... Lawrence St. James
Geordie (1955) .... Lord Paunceton
King's Rhapsody (1955) .... Jules
Private's Progress (1956) .... Mr. Windrush Snr.
The Man Who Never Was (1956) .... Scientist
The Silken Affair (1956) .... Mr. Blucher
Dry Rot (1956) .... Yokel
Three Men in a Boat (1956 film) .... Baskcomb, 2nd Old Gentleman
Brothers in Law (1957) .... Kendall Grimes QC
The Admirable Crichton (1957) .... Vicar
Campbell's Kingdom (1957) .... Minor Role (uncredited)
Barnacle Bill (1957) .... Angler
The Naked Truth (1957) .... Rev. Cedric Bastable
Happy Is the Bride (1958) .... 1st Magistrate
Gideon's Day (1958) .... The Judge
Dracula (1958) .... Undertaker
Behind the Mask (1958) .... Sir Oswald Pettiford
Bachelor of Hearts (1958) .... Dr. Butson
Kidnapped (1959) .... Mr. Rankeillor
The Captain's Table (1959) .... Canon Swingler
Carlton-Browne of the F.O. (1959) .... Resident Advisor Davidson
The Hound of the Baskervilles (1959) .... Bishop
I'm All Right Jack (1959) .... Windrush Snr.
And the Same to You (1960) .... Bishop
Peeping Tom (1960) .... Elderly Gentleman Customer
The Day They Robbed the Bank of England (1960) .... Assistant Curator
The Brides of Dracula (1960) .... Dr. Tobler
The Hellfire Club (1961) .... Judge
Fury at Smugglers' Bay (1961) .... Duke of Avon
Double Bunk (1961) .... Reverend Thomas
Postman's Knock (1962) .... Psychiatrist
Go to Blazes (1962) .... Salesman
The Phantom of the Opera (1962) .... 2nd Cabby
The Brain (1962) .... Dr. Miller
Call Me Bwana (1963) .... Psychiatrist (uncredited)
Heavens Above! (1963) .... Rockeby
Circus World (1964) .... Billy Hennigan
First Men in the Moon (1964) .... Dymchurch Registrar
Murder Ahoy! (1964) .... Bishop Faulkner
A Jolly Bad Fellow (1964) .... Dr. Woolley
You Must Be Joking! (1965) .... Salesman (final film role)

As screenwriter

 Night Birds (1930)
 The W Plan (1930)
 Two Worlds (1930)
 A Night in Montmartre (1931)
 Children of Fortune (1931)
 City of Song (1931)
 Sally in Our Alley (1931)
 The Water Gipsies (1932)
 Strange Evidence (1933)
 Lorna Doone (1934)
Nell Gwyn (1934)
Tudor Rose (1936)
Victoria the Great (1937)
Action for Slander (1937)
The Thief of Bagdad (1940)
The First of the Few (1942)
They Flew Alone (1942)
Squadron Leader X (1943)
The Adventures of Tartu (1943) (uncredited)
They Met in the Dark  (1943)
Yellow Canary (1943)

Playwright credits
Youth  A Play in Three Acts
The Little White Thought  A Fantastic Scrap
 "D" Company 
 Six men of Dorset: A play in three acts (with Harvey Brooks)
Paddly Pools:  A Little Fairy Play
The Bet: A Play in One Act (based on a short story by Chekov)
Black 'Ell (1916); Malleson's anti-war play was refused permission for performance in 1916, and not produced in the UK until 1925
Michael (1917) adapted from the short story What Men Live By by Leo Tolstoy
The Artist (1919) adapted from the short story An Artist's Story by Anton Chekhov
The Fanatics (1924), a comedy in three acts
Conflict (1925) Revived by Mint Theater Company in June 2018 
Yours Unfaithfully (1933); Revived by Mint Theater Company in 2016. Performed off-Broadway in New York City for a limited run in early-2017 starring Max von Essen.
 The Glorious Days (1952) musical play, co-wrote the book with Robert Nesbitt
Molière: Three Plays (1960); contains The Slave of Truth (Le Misanthrope), Tartuffe and The Imaginary Invalid

Translation work
Malleson translated many plays by Molière, including Le bourgeois gentilhomme, L'avare, L'école des femmes, Le Misanthrope, Tartuffe, Le malade imaginaire and the one-act play Sganarelle. He also adapted a German play, Flieger, by Hermann Rossmann, under the English title The Ace. This was later filmed as Hell in the Heavens.

He wrote the subtitles for a filmed version of a Comédie Française production of Le Bourgeois Gentilhomme, which was shown at the Academy Cinema in London in 1962.

Vocal work

In 1964, he, Roger Livesey, Terry-Thomas, Rita Webb, Avril Angers, and Judith Furse, recorded 'Indian Summer of an Uncle', and 'Jeeves Takes Charge' for the Caedmon Audio record label, (Caedmon Audio TC-1137-s).

References

External links

Plays by Miles Malleson on the Great War Theatre website

Alumni of Emmanuel College, Cambridge
English male film actors
English male screenwriters
People from Croydon
People educated at Brighton College
1888 births
1969 deaths
20th-century English male actors
British male comedy actors
English dramatists and playwrights
English socialists
English pacifists
20th-century English screenwriters
20th-century English male writers